Puerto Rico Highway 253 (PR-253)  is a tertiary route located in Culebra, Puerto Rico. It goes from the PR-250 on the drawbridge over the Ensenada Canal and runs east, Playa Sardinas II, towards Fulladosa and Punta Aloe. It extends approximately 3.2 km to the access road to Punta del Soldado.

Major intersections

See also

 List of highways numbered 253

References

External links
 

253
Culebra, Puerto Rico